The 1959 European Cup final was the fourth final in the pan-European football competition, the European Cup, now known as the UEFA Champions League. It was contested by Real Madrid of Spain and Reims from France. It was played at the Neckarstadion in Stuttgart on 3 June 1959 in front of 80,000 people. The match finished 2–0 to Real Madrid, winning their fourth European Cup in a row and beating Reims in final for the second time in four years, following the 1956 final. Real Madrid dominated the match, with goals scored by Enrique Mateos and Alfredo Di Stéfano.

Route to the final

Match

Details

See also
1958–59 European Cup
1956 European Cup final – contested between same teams
Real Madrid CF in international football competitions

Notes

References

External links
European Cup 1958/59 from UEFA
European Cup 1958/59 from RSSSF

1
European Cup Final 1959
European Cup Final 1959
European Cup Final 1959
1959
European
Euro
20th century in Stuttgart
European Cup Final
Football in Baden-Württemberg
Sports competitions in Stuttgart
European Cup Final, 1959